Nathalie Santamaria (born 1973 in Ajaccio, Corse-du-Sud) is a French singer. She represented France in the Eurovision Song Contest 1995, performing twelfth on the night, before Hungary, and after Croatia, with the song "Il me donne rendez-vous", and placed fourth of twenty-three, with 94 points.

References

1973 births
Living people
Musicians from Ajaccio
Eurovision Song Contest entrants for France
Eurovision Song Contest entrants of 1995
21st-century French singers
21st-century French women singers